Radoš may refer to:

Serbian masculine given name
Radoš Bajić (born 1953), actor
Radoš Bulatović (born 1984), footballer
Radoš Čubrić (born 1934), cyclist
Radoš Protić (born 1987), footballer
Radoš Šešlija (born 1992), basketball player

Croatian surname
Bože Radoš (born 1964), Roman Catholic prelate
Grgur Radoš (born 1988), footballer
Ivan Radoš (born 1984), footballer
Jozo Radoš (born 1956), politician
Pavel Radoš (born 1991), footballer

See also
Radošević
Radoševići (disambiguation)
Radoševo
Radošiće
Radoševac (disambiguation)
Radoši (disambiguation)
Radošov

Slavic masculine given names
Serbian masculine given names
Croatian surnames